Barnesville is an unincorporated community in Macon County, in the U.S. state of Missouri.

History
A post office called Barnesville was established in 1878, and remained in operation until 1904.

References

Unincorporated communities in Macon County, Missouri
Unincorporated communities in Missouri